State Road 405 (SR 405) is a state highway making a sweeping arc in Titusville, Florida, and, via the nearby NASA Parkway, providing a major access route for the Kennedy Space Center on nearby Merritt Island.  The northern terminus of SR 405 is an intersection with North Washington Avenue (U.S. 1) in downtown Titusville; the eastern terminus is at a cloverleaf interchange with U.S. 1 near the American Police Hall of Fame & Museum. It is locally known as South Street and Columbia Boulevard.

Route description
South of Cheney Highway (SR 50), SR 405 is signed east–west and is named Columbia Boulevard. North of SR 50, SR 405 is signed north–south and is named South Street.  It parallels Interstate 95 for  - from Cheney Highway to Willis Drive - before veering off to the northeast towards downtown Titusville.

In addition, SR 405 passes by Space Coast Regional Airport (formerly Ti-Co (Titusville-Cocoa) Airport) and Enchanted Forest Park.

Major intersections

References

External links

405
405